Golden Hits is a greatest hits album by Greek singer Demis Roussos, released in 1975 on Philips Records.

Commercial performance 
The album reached no. 13 in Norway and no. 19 in Sweden.

Track listing 
LP Philips 6499 724 (Netherlands)

Charts

References

External links 
 Demis Roussos – Golden Hits at Discogs
 Demis Roussos – Golden Hits at Swedishcharts.com

1975 compilation albums
Demis Roussos albums
Philips Records albums